Woodstock in Natchez, Mississippi is a Greek Revival building built in 1851.  It was listed on the National Register of Historic Places in 1989. The house stands  from the Natchez city center.

References

Houses on the National Register of Historic Places in Mississippi
Houses completed in 1851
Houses in Natchez, Mississippi
Greek Revival houses in Mississippi
1851 establishments in Mississippi
National Register of Historic Places in Natchez, Mississippi